The Ingeborg Psalter  is a late 12th century illuminated psalter now housed in the  Musée Condé of Chantilly, France.

It was created about 1195 in northern France for Ingeborg of Denmark, wife of King Philip II of France. It is unknown who commissioned the Psalter for Ingeborg, but it may have been commissioned by either Stephen of Tournai or Eleanor, Countess of Vermandois. It is one of the most significant surviving examples of early Gothic painting.

The manuscript was prayerbook for private devotionals and contains a calendar, the 150 Psalms in Latin plus other liturgical texts. There are 200 extent folios. The text is written in an early Gothic minuscule.

External links 

Link to the manuscript in its entirety on the IRHT website

 Jesse Tree: Ingeborg Psalter on "All About Mary" The University of Dayton's Marian Library/International Marian Research Institute (IMRI) is the world's largest repository of books, artwork and artifacts devoted to Mary, the mother of Christ, and a pontifical center of research and scholarship with a vast presence in cyberspace.

1190s books
12th-century illuminated psalters
Illuminated manuscripts of the Musée Condé